The  is a professional wrestling championship owned by the DDT Pro-Wrestling (DDT) promotion.

The title was first announced during DDT's year-end event on December 23, 2012, becoming the promotion's fifth active title. The first champions were crowned on January 12, 2013. The title has also been defended in All Japan Pro Wrestling (AJPW) as part of a relationship between DDT and AJPW. The championship is contested for by teams of three wrestlers.

Like most professional wrestling championships, the title is won as a result of a scripted match. , there have been 50 reigns shared among 58 wrestlers and 37 teams. The title is currently held by Shinya Aoki, Super Sasadango Machine and Yuki Ueno who are in their first reign as a team.

History
DDT Pro-Wrestling (DDT) had previously promoted matches for the Jiyugaoka 6-Person Tag Team Championship, the Sea Of Japan 6-Person Tag Team Championship and the UWA World Trios Championship, but although all three titles were last held by DDT wrestlers, none of them have been seen in the promotion since the end of 2010. The inaugural KO-D 6-Man Tag Team Champions were determined on January 12, 2013, in a four-team single-elimination tournament, which saw Team Dream Futures (Keisuke Ishii, Shigehiro Irie and Soma Takao) defeat Team Shiro (Akito, Makoto Oishi and Sanshiro Takagi) in the finals to win the title.

Reigns

Combined reigns

By team

By wrestler

See also
DDT Jiyugaoka Six-Person Tag Team Championship
Sea of Japan 6-Person Tag Team Championship
UWA World Trios Championship

References

External links
DDT Pro-Wrestling's official website
KO-D 6-Man Tag Team Title history at Wrestling-Titles.com
 KO-D 6-Man Tag Team Title history at Cagematch.net

DDT Pro-Wrestling championships
Trios wrestling tag team championships